Frank Charles "Sanny" Jacobsson (6 July 1930 – 26 February 2017) was a Swedish professional footballer who spent his entire career as a  winger for the club GAIS in the Swedish Allsvenskan.

Professional career
Jacobsson spent his entire professional career with GAIS, from 1949–1960. Jacobsson played an important role in the 1953–54 Allsvenskan season, by scoring 4 goals in the last 3 games of the season. These matches were title deciders in a close race to end the season, and helped GAIS win their first Allsvenskan in 23 years.

From 1960–1961, Jacobsson managed Vårgårda IK.

Personal life
Jacobsson was born in the United States to a Swedish father and Italian mother, and moved to Sweden at a young age. Jacobsson played professional football alongside his brother, Karl-Alfred Jacobsson, with GAIS and the Sweden national football team. His son, Roberto Jacobsson, was also associated with GAIS as a manager and player.

Honours

Club
GAIS
Allsvenskan (1): 1953–54

References

External links
NFT Profile
Svensk Fotboll Profile

1930 births
2017 deaths
Soccer players from Boston
Swedish footballers
Sweden international footballers
American soccer players
Swedish people of Italian descent
American people of Swedish descent
American people of Italian descent
GAIS players
Superettan players
Ettan Fotboll players
Association football wingers